Teramo Piaggio (died before 1562) was an Italian painter of the late-Renaissance, active in Genoa.

He was born in Zoagli. He was a pupil of Ludovico Brea, and painted in collaboration with Andrea Semini.

References
‘’The City of Genoa’’. Robert Walter Carden; Methuen and Co., London (1908). Page 175.

16th-century Italian painters
Italian male painters
Painters from Genoa
Italian Renaissance painters
Year of death unknown
Year of birth unknown